Anthony Dirk Barron (born August 17, 1966) is a former Major League Baseball player. Drafted by the Los Angeles Dodgers in the 7th round of the 1987 Major League Baseball draft. Barron played for the Montreal Expos in 1995 as a replacement player. He made the full roster the next season to play the following year in 1996, and later the Philadelphia Phillies in 1997.

External links

Tony Barron at Baseball Almanac

1966 births
Living people
Albuquerque Dukes players
American expatriate baseball players in Canada
American expatriate baseball players in Mexico
Bakersfield Dodgers players
Baseball players from Portland, Oregon
Calgary Cannons players
Diablos Rojos del México players
Great Falls Dodgers players
Harrisburg Senators players
Jacksonville Suns players
Langosteros de Cancún players
Major League Baseball right fielders
Mexican League baseball first basemen
Mexican League baseball outfielders
Montreal Expos players
Ottawa Lynx players
Pericos de Puebla players
Philadelphia Phillies players
Piratas de Campeche players
Rojos del Águila de Veracruz players
Salem Dodgers players
San Antonio Missions players
Scranton/Wilkes-Barre Red Barons players
Sultanes de Monterrey players
Tacoma Rainiers players
Willamette Bearcats baseball players
Vero Beach Dodgers players